By Any Means is a British television drama series that premiered on BBC One on 22 September 2013.

Synopsis
The series follows the escapades of a clandestine unit that exists in the grey area between law and justice. Living on the edge, they play the criminal elite at their own game. The team consists of the leader, sharp and elusive Jack Quinn (Warren Brown), straight-talking Jessica Jones (Shelley Conn), digital whizz-kid Thomas "TomTom" Tomkins (Andrew-Lee Potts) and Charlie O'Brien (Elliot Knight). They stop at nothing, as they weave a web of cunning and deception, in order to trap their targets and bring them to justice. Details of the criminals originate from a mysterious Helen Barlow (Gina McKee).

Production
Filming began in Birmingham on 26 April 2013. Belinda Campbell, the executive producer for Red Planet Pictures, said: "By Any Means is a gripping and edgy drama, wonderfully crafted by our talented writing team. We’re delighted to have such a strong line-up of talent both on and off screen to translate these intricate plots and characters. With the action taking place on the cusp of the law, it provides the perfect premise for dramatic scenes, surprise twists and turns in the plot, as well as brilliantly complex and rich characters."

Polly Hill, head of Independent Drama for the BBC, said: "It’s great to see such a strong cast come together to form this original team in By Any Means. Tony has created a maverick team which we think our BBC One audience will enjoy and this cast will brilliantly bring that to screen."

The between scene montages are London, and the drama is set in named London locations and areas. Some scenes were filmed at Birmingham Film Studios. Spring Grove House was also used as a Colombian embassy. Tim Key, producer of the series for Red Planet Pictures, said, "Spring Grove House is a fantastic location for filming and we’re delighted to have been given permission to shoot there. We looked at a lot of locations for these key scenes, but Spring Grove House provided exactly what we were looking for, working perfectly as the interior of the Embassy." Other places where scenes were filmed include the Victoria Law Courts, Hotel La Tour and the Hyatt, Colmore Row, New Street, the Mailbox, Cannon Hill Park, and Sutton Park, West Midlands.

In September 2013, it was revealed that Arsenal F.C. had banned By Any Means from using the club’s branded shirts in the first episode because the storyline portrayed its fans as criminals. Red Planet Pictures used generic tops without any branding instead.

Cast

The core cast includes the team of four and their contact inside the police, Helen Barlow. Other actors join the cast for each episode.

 Warren Brown as Jack Quinn
 Shelley Conn as Jessica Jones
 Andrew-Lee Potts as Thomas "TomTom" Tomkins
 Elliot Knight as Charlie O'Brien
 Gina McKee as Helen Barlow

Episode list

Reception

Ratings
Overnight figures showed that the first episode of By Any Means on 22 September 2013 was watched by 16.4% of the viewing audience for that time, with 4.11 million watching it. The second episode was watched by 14.1% of the viewing audience with 3.46 million according to overnight figures. The third episode was watched by 11.8% of the viewing audience with 2.91 million viewers, according to overnight figures. The fourth, fifth and sixth episodes had viewing audiences of 12.2%, 12.6% and 12.0% respectively.

Critical reception
Jasper Rees of The Daily Telegraph commented: "By Any Means is the brainchild of Tony Jordan, and shares much of the DNA of his inexhaustible hit Hustle. There is trickery and quippery from photogenic leads, cartoon hoodlums are duly bested, and it’s all shot in swish kinetic fast-forward. ... Along the way there was an awful lot of self-satisfied yak from the leads, who need to watch it or they could easily annoy the crap out of whoever’s not watching Downton." Matt Baylis of the Daily Express said: "If you wanted to feel really angry at how the BBC spends our money, you could have watched By Any Means, a revoltingly poor action drama about a covert police unit that operates beyond the law. Its presence and unspeakable badness make you suspect that some writers merely have to shove a shopping list in the direction of the BBC to get a commission." The Independent'''s Alice Jones said "It looked promising, if derivative, enough – some Mad Men-style silhouetted credits, lots of Guy Ritchie zooming and jump-cuts, a classy cast – but it added up to lowest common denominator drama."Metro said "By Any Means failed to rise above the clichés in its first episode". Radio Times said "every second of By Any Means is ridiculous, yet it’s well done and strangely likeable, a noisy brew of Hustle and Spooks with a dash of Charlie's Angels." Yahoo! said: "Despite the cliché ridden script and stereotypical characters, the show's biggest downfall was its lack of direction. At times, it felt like it was trying too hard to be a hybrid of some of television's recent successes. Stylistically, it was very similar to Hustle, although some may argue this was always going to be the case with Tony Jordan leading the writing team, and the group's tactics seemed very reminiscent of Sherlock, just without the spark."

Alison Graham of Radio Times said: "By Any Means is sweetly retro, even though it thinks it’s bang-on 21st-century computer-game fast, as good guys catch bad guys (by any illegal means, of course), all played out against a painfully loud, jangly soundtrack that’s as insistent as a chainsaw. But it fits the pattern of everything from The A-Team to Charlie's Angels'' (it even has a shadowy, though female, figure issuing the orders from afar), a thick-eared adventure yarn that exists purely to entertain. Which is why I can’t help but like it."

Home media
The series will be released on DVD in the UK on 8 September 2014.
as of June 2015 it is still to be released in the UK, although a Dutch DVD exists with edited 50 minute episodes, as opposed to the 60 minutes broadcast in the UK.

References

External links
 
 
 
 By Any Means Trailer

British crime television series
BBC high definition shows
BBC television dramas
2013 British television series debuts
2010s British drama television series
2013 British television series endings
Television shows set in London
2010s British television miniseries
English-language television shows
2010s British crime television series
BBC television miniseries